Jone Lopes Pedro (born 28 March 1990) is an Angolan-Portuguese-German basketball player for Petro de Luanda. He also plays for the Angola national basketball team.

Professional career
Pedro started his professional career with Giants Düsseldorf in 2011. In 2013, Pedro left for Angola to play for ASA in the Angolan Basketball League.

In June 2019, Pedro joined Petro de Luanda. On 18 May 2021, in his debut in the Basketball Africa League (BAL), Pedro had 17 points and 17 rebounds in a win against AS Police.

National team career
Pedro has been a member of the Angolan national basketball team and has played with his country in the qualifiers for the 2019 FIBA Basketball World Cup. He has also played for the Angolan 3x3 basketball team.

Personal
Pedro lived in the Netherlands and Portugal as a child and is the son of Adriano Pedro, who was an Angolan national team basketball player.

BAL career statistics

|-
|style="text-align:left;"|2021
|style="text-align:left;"|Petro de Luanda
| 6 || 6 || 25.1 || .636 || –|| .588 || 10.5 || 1.0 || 1.2 || 1.5|| 11.0
|- class="sortbottom"
| style="text-align:center;" colspan="2"|Career
| 6 || 6 || 25.1 || .636 || –|| .588 || 10.5 || 1.0 || 1.2 || 1.5|| 11.0

References

1990 births
Living people
Angolan men's basketball players
Atlético Petróleos de Luanda basketball players
Atlético Sport Aviação basketball players
C.D. Primeiro de Agosto basketball players
Centers (basketball)